Sebastián Pérez (died 1593) was a Roman Catholic prelate who served as Bishop of Osma (1583–1593).

Biography
Sebastián Pérez  was born in Montilla, Spain.
On 9 March 1583, he was appointed during the papacy of Pope Gregory XIII as Bishop of Osma.
He served as Bishop of Osma until his death on 27 July 1593.

Episcopal succession
While bishop, he was the principal consecrator of:
Pedro González Acevedo, Bishop of Orense (1587); 
and principal co-consecrator of:
Antonio Manrique, Bishop of Calahorra y La Calzada (1587); 
Antonio Zapata y Cisneros, Bishop of Cádiz (1587);
Pedro Portocarrero (bishop), Bishop of Calahorra y La Calzada (1589); and
Juan de Zuazola, Bishop of Astorga (1589).

References

External links and additional sources
 (for Chronology of Bishops) 
 (for Chronology of Bishops) 

16th-century Roman Catholic bishops in Spain
Bishops appointed by Pope Gregory XIII
1593 deaths